Parliamentary elections to the Assembly of Kosovo (Serbian Cyrillic: , transliterated ) have been held four times since 1999 with the latest in December 2010. The Assembly was an institution within the Provisional Institutions of Self-Government (PISG) established by the United Nations Interim Administration Mission in Kosovo (UNMIK) to provide 'provisional, democratic self-government' in advance of a decision on the final status of Kosovo. Kosovo, formerly a province of Serbia, came under UN administration in 1999 and unilaterally declared its independence in February 2008. The Assembly elected in 2007 continued in office after the declaration of independence.

Since the Kosovo War, the country has held four parliamentary elections, one every three years, in 2001, 2004, 2007, and 2010 respectively. The first two were administered by the Organization for Security and Co-operation in Europe (OSCE) and the second two monitored by the international community, with the OSCE and other observing groups concluding that these elections were generally fair and free.

Under Kosovo's Constitutional Framework, which established the PISG, elections were to be held every three years for the Assembly. The Assembly then in turn elects a president and prime minister.  The Assembly had 120 members elected for a three-year term: 100 members elected by proportional representation, and 20 members representing national minorities (10 Serbian, 4 Roma, Ashkali and Egyptian, 3 Bosniak, 2 Turkish and 1 Gorani).  Under the new Constitution of 2008, the guaranteed seats for Serbs and other minorities remains the same, but in addition they may gain extra seats according to their share of the vote. Kosovo has a multi-party system, with numerous parties and the system of proportional representation and guaranteed minority representation means that no one party is likely to have a parliamentary majority. In addition, a minimum number of Ministers were and remain reserved for Serbs and other minorities. The voting age in Kosovo is 18 years old.

Parliamentary elections (latest)

2021

Community Assembly of Kosovo

According to UNMIK practice, Serbian national referendums and elections for Parliament and President were allowed in Kosovo, but local elections were organized separately by UNMIK and the PISG. In spite of this, Serbia carried out local elections in Kosovo in 2008; these were not recognized by UNMIK.

The Community Assembly of Kosovo and Metohija is a local government created by the Serbian minority in the Kosovo city of Mitrovica in response to the 2008 Kosovo declaration of independence. The first elections for the Assembly took place on May 11, 2008 to coincide with the 2008 Serbian local elections.

In the Brussels agreement, the government of Serbia agreed to integrate Kosovo Serb political structures into the government of Kosovo.

See also
 Electoral calendar
 Electoral system
 List of political parties in Kosovo

Notes

References

External links

Central Election Commission of the Republic of Kosovo
Adam Carr's Election Archive
Parties and elections
OSCE Mission in Kosovo, Elections
Assembly of Kosovo